The New Jersey Revolution were members of the American Indoor Football Association based in Morristown, New Jersey, with home games at the George Mennen arena. The Revolution name referred to New Jersey's nickname, The Crossroads of the Revolution, as the state was the site of many American Revolution battles. It was the only indoor football team within the proximity of the New York metropolitan area in the 2010 season.

History
The team began play as the New York/New Jersey Revolution in the Great Lakes Indoor Football League's inaugural 2006 season.  Although the team was based in New York City, they ended up playing an all road schedule that year. The New York/New Jersey Revolution lost every game they played in 2006 going 0–10 on the season.

Starting in 2007, the team played their home games at the Mennen Arena in Morristown, New Jersey. The New York/New Jersey Revolution went 1–11 in their first season as members of the rebranded Continental Indoor Football League (CIFL). The team won its first game on May 5, 2007, with a 48–47 victory over the Summit County Rumble in Tallmadge, Ohio led by first year head coach Scott Veith.

The team announced they changed their name to the New Jersey Revolution and introduced a new logo for the 2008 season. After losing the season's first four games, the Revs got their second win and first at home, defeating the Chesapeake Tide 49–47 at Mennen Arena. In their second season in the CIFL, the New Jersey Revolution finished with a 3–9 record.

The team was removed from the CIFL prior to the 2009 season and played as an indoor semi-professional franchise for the season.  They played three games at home, all victories over other semi-pro teams: 77–18 over the East Penn Sting, 62–0 over the New York State Broncos, and a 69–24 over the Lebanon Valley Cardinals. On October 1, 2009, the Revolution announced they had joined the American Indoor Football Association (AIFA) for the 2010 season.

In the 2010 AIFA season, the NJ Revolution went 0–14 on the season. They lost six home games at the George Mennen Arena, all seven road games and one neutral site game played June 12, 2010, at the Sun National Bank Arena in Trenton, New Jersey, as the road team losing to the Harrisburg Stampede 96–44. The neutral site game was originally announced as an exhibition contest but then listed in the final overall AIFA league standings. The purpose of this game was to announce that in Trenton Steel would be joining the AIFA in 2011.

The New Jersey Revolution ceased operations on September 8, 2010, via a press release thanking the fans. The AIFA suspended operations four months later with many of its teams, including the Trenton Steel, joining the Southern Indoor Football League (SIFL). The AIFA returned in 2012 after the SIFL ceased operations as American Indoor Football (AIF).

Team and season results

Season-by-season overall results

2006 season

2007 season

2008 season

2009 season
Played an independent three-game season against other east coast based semi-professional teams.

2010 season

References

External links 
 New Jersey Revolution official site
 Revolution's 2006 stats
 Revolution's 2007 stats
 Revolution's 2010 stats
 
 

Former Continental Indoor Football League teams
American Indoor Football Association teams
Defunct American football teams in New Jersey
American football teams in the New York metropolitan area
American football teams established in 2006
American football teams disestablished in 2010
2006 establishments in New Jersey
2010 disestablishments in New Jersey